Trudfront is a rural locality (a selo) in Ikryaninsky District, Astrakhan Oblast, Russia. The population was 2,721 as of 2010. There are 35 streets.

Geography 
Trudfront is located 25 km south of Ikryanoye (the district's administrative centre) by road. Chulpan is the nearest rural locality.

References 

Rural localities in Ikryaninsky District